Bremke is a village in the Gemeinde Gleichen in southern Lower Saxony.

The village of 887  residents is located about ten kilometers south-east of Göttingen and lies in the shadow of the two small mountains called the Gleichen for the castles that once stood on their peaks. Bremke is the location of an outdoor stage, the Brüder Grimm Waldbühne, built in 1949, which stages performances in the summer.  The local synagogue was destroyed during Kristallnacht in 1938, and the last of the small number of Jews living in the village left the following year.  On Eschenberg there are remnants of the village's Jewish cemetery.

Government
The village mayor is  Karin Jürgens.

Education
There is a public elementary school (Grundschule) in the village.

External links
http://www.gleichen-bremke.de (Official Homepage)
https://web.archive.org/web/20070730232517/http://www.gleichen.de/bremke/home.htm (in German)
http://www.wohlfuehlportal.de/Deutschland/3/7/Gleichen/Theater/ (in German)
http://www.arikah.com/enzyklopadie/Gleichen_(Landkreis_G%C3%B6ttingen) (in German)
http://www.grundschulebremke.de/
https://web.archive.org/web/20120123141200/http://www.feuerwehr-bremke.de/

Villages in Lower Saxony
Holocaust locations in Germany